Abu Bakr Jamāl al-Dīn Muḥammad ibn Shams al-Dīn Muḥammad ibn Sharaf al-Dīn Muḥammad ibn al-Ḥasan ibn Ṣāliḥ ibn Yaḥyā ibn Ṭāhir ibn Muḥammad ibn al-Khaṭīb ʿAbd al-Raḥīm ibn Nubāta, better known simply as Ibn Nubāta (April 1287 – October 14, 1366) was an Arab poet of the Mamluk period. Best known for his poetry, he also wrote prose.  His works are largely not, or not critically, edited to this day, but in 2018 Thomas Bauer was reported to be completing an edition of his al-Qaṭr an-Nubātī ('Ibn Nubātah's Sweet Drops'). Research on Ibn Nubata's work is still in its infancy. 

Ibn Nubata was the son of a Hadith scholar and from early youth his interest in poetry emerged in short poems he wrote. Born in Fusṭāṭ, in 1316 he left Cairo for Damascus and lived there until 1360, taking short stays in Hama and Aleppo. However, the Sultan An-Nasir al-Hasan ordered his return to Cairo. 

Ibn Nubata, alongside Ṣafīddīn al-Ḥillī, was one of the two most celebrated Arab poets of the 14th century. 

Ibn Nubata died on October 14, 1366 (8 Safar 768 AH), and is buried in the Qalawun cemetery of Al-Mansur Qalawun. 

Ibn Nubāta was a seminal writer in the development of the epigrammatic poetic form known as maqṭūʿ: al-Qaṭr an-Nubātī is thought to be the first sole-authored collection of poems in this genre.

References

Further reading
 Thomas Bauer:  Communication and Emotion. The case of Ibn Nubātah's "Kindertotenlieder".  In:  Mamlūk Studies Review . 7, 2003, pp. 49–95. (online, PDF, 34.69 MB)
Thomas Bauer, “Dignity at Stake: mujūn epigrams by Ibn Nubāta (686–768/1287–1366) and his contemporaries” in The Rude, the Bad and the Bawdy. Essays in Honour of Professor Geert Jan van Gelder, ed. Adam Talib, Marlé Hammond, and Arie Schippers (Cambridge: Gibb Memorial Trust, 2014).
 Thomas Bauer:  Ibn Nubātah al-Misrī (686–768 / 1287–1366). Life and Works . Part I:  The Life of Ibn Nubatah . In:  Mamlūk Studies Review  January 12, 2008, pp. 1–35. (online, PDF, 1.22 MB)
 Thomas Bauer:  Ibn Nubatah al-Misri (686–768 / 1287–1366). Life and Works . Part II:  The Divan of Ibn Nubatah . In:  Mamlūk Studies Review  February 12, 2008.
 Carl Brockelmann:  History of Arabic Literature ''. Brill, Leiden 1996, I, p. 11f, II, p. 4.
 

1287 births
1366 deaths
14th-century Arabic poets
14th-century people from the Mamluk Sultanate
Islamic literature
Writers from Cairo